Worms Armageddon is a 1999 turn-based strategy video game developed and published by Team17. It was originally released for the Microsoft Windows operating system, and was later ported to the PlayStation, Dreamcast, Nintendo 64, and Game Boy Color. Worms Armageddon is the third installment in the Worms series. In the game, the player controls a team of up to eight earthworms tasked with defeating an opposing team using a wide range of weapons at their disposal. The game takes place on a destructible and customizable two-dimensional board and is characterized by cartoonish graphics and a unique brand of humour.

Worms Armageddon was originally developed as an expansion pack to Worms 2 and initially titled Wormageddon before it was released as a standalone game. Worms Armageddon was acclaimed by critics, who praised the refined gameplay and stylized graphics, and it has been featured in a number of "greatest games of all time" lists. Worms Armageddon is still updated periodically as of 2020, and was released on the Steam platform in 2013.

Gameplay

Gameplay is turn-based, with each team moving in sequence, which is determined randomly, across two-dimensional terrain. During a single turn, a team can only move one of their worms (unless an item that allows the team to select their worm is used). Worms can walk and jump, as well as (when the proper items are available) swing by rope, parachute,  teleport, and bungee. The objective of a traditional match is to defeat all opposing teams by killing their worms, although in the campaign some missions have other objectives such as collecting a specific crate.

Each worm begins the round with a specific amount of health, which is predefined by the chosen game options or by scripting in campaign levels. When hit with a weapon, the worm will lose health depending upon the power of the weapon and the directness of the hit. A worm can be killed either by exploding after having its health reduced to zero or by being knocked into the water around and below the level.

The game includes a wide variety of weapons, including melee, projectile, and explosive weapons, as well as airstrike-based attacks. Some are based on real-life arms, such as the shotgun, bazooka, and hand grenade; others are rather fanciful and cartoonish, such as the sheep, which serves as a mobile explosive, and the skunk, which releases poisonous gas. In a normal match, all teams begin with the same weapons, based on the chosen weapon set. Some weapons may not become available until a certain number of turns pass. Depending on the game options, additional weapons may randomly fall onto the terrain in airdropped and teleported crates. In addition to normal weapons, during team creation, each team chooses a special weapon which becomes available to them after a certain number of turns. The special weapons are more powerful than regular weapons and often offer special abilities; super weapons will rarely fall in weapon crates. These weapons are often based on cartoonish themes, such as the French Sheep Strike, and usually devastating in power. In homage to the film Monty Python and the Holy Grail, one of the game weapons is a Holy Hand Grenade, with a sound-effect reminiscent of the Hallelujah chorus from Handel's Messiah.

Gameplay modes
Worms Armageddon includes a series of training missions, a single-player campaign with premade missions, a deathmatch mode in which the player fights increasingly difficult and outnumbered battles against the computer, local multiplayer, and online multiplayer.

Local multiplayer allows the player to select which teams participate in the battle as well as the number of worms and handicaps, which options and weapons are used, and the level to be played on. The matches can use any combination of human and computer teams, provided at least one team is human. Additionally, multiple worm teams can form an alliance for the match by selecting the same team color – they will still operate separately in movement rotation but share weapons and score. If multiple human players are using the same computer, the game functions in a hotseat mode.

Online multiplayer is set up similarly to local multiplayer but allows the players to be at separate computers. Additionally, hotseat can be combined with online play, so multiple human players can use each computer.

Worms Armageddon features a multiplayer Internet service called WormNet. This service allows one player to host a game online and others to join it. The host can choose settings such as the landscape and scheme. In the past, it used to keep a score and ranking system for the players.

Customization
Worms Armageddon includes a very high level of customizability – in multiplayer games or skirmishes, the player can create custom game modes with preferred gameplay options and weapon sets. Regular options include starting health, whether the worms can move, how long a turn lasts, and sudden death options. Weapons settings include what weapons the teams start with, which weapons will fall in crates and how often, and how powerful individual weapons are. Worms Armageddon offers several levels of customizability outside of direct gameplay options.

The game offers players the ability to create their own custom teams. Each team has its own name and includes eight individually named worms. The player can also change the team's special weapon, grave marker, flag, victory fanfare, and voice set. In addition to numerous defaults available, the game offers the ability to import custom voices.

The game includes a random terrain generator, a basic terrain editor which allows the user to create the shape of the terrain with brushes, and a more complex terrain-import system which allows the user to import custom-made terrains in image format, which the game automatically converts into playable terrains.

Development
Worms Armageddon was originally intended to be an expansion pack to Worms 2, but it was eventually developed as a standalone game. It was intended to be the last game of the Worms franchise, but Worms creator Andy Davidson felt that it needed more content before being released, leading to the development of Worms World Party. It was also going to be released under the name Wormageddon, but Team17 changed the name to Worms Armageddon because of close similarities to the name of the game Carmageddon. It was released initially for PCs in 1999 in Europe and on 31 May 1999 in North America, published by Hasbro Interactive under the MicroProse brand. The game was eventually ported to Dreamcast and PlayStation on 30 November, Game Boy Color on 19 January 2000, and Nintendo 64 on 30 March 2000. The Nintendo 64 version is one of the first Nintendo 64 games to feature a terrain editor and generator. A Macintosh version was being developed by MacSoft, but it has since been cancelled. Worms Armageddon was produced by Martyn Brown and composed by Bjørn Lynne, Karl Morton was the game's lead programmer, and Dan Cartwright was the game's lead artist.

Worms Armageddon was initially released on Steam for a limited time as the preorder bonus for Worms Revolution. The Steam release included all improvements from the previously-released updates. This release was made available on 12 September 2012. Worms Armageddon was released onto the Steam store as a standalone game on 20 March 2013.

Despite its age, Worms Armageddon still receives periodic updates, mainly from two programmers known as Deadcode and CyberShadow, recruited by Team17. These updates address bugs and compatibility issues, and also add new features to the game, such as support for a greater number of worms in a match and support for arbitrarily-sized colour levels. The latest update was on 16 July 2020.

Reception

The PlayStation version of Worms Armageddon received a "Gold" sales award from the Entertainment and Leisure Software Publishers Association (ELSPA), indicating sales of at least 200,000 copies in the United Kingdom. Worms Armageddon received generally positive reviews from video game critics, averaging a PC score of 88% on the GameRankings website. The main element across all the versions of the game that the critics considered praiseworthy is the gameplay.

The PC version of Worms Armageddon was critically successful. Whilst writing that veterans of Worms 2 would find the game to be similar, Greg Kasavin of GameSpot praised the game for being easy to play and control and humorous and the game's graphics, physics, and seemingly endless customization as well as the game's WormNet. He also likened the single-player missions to the classic game of Lemmings in that the missions often required the player to precisely utilize a limited supply of weapons and tools to accomplish the objective. Among his only criticisms are that the AI-controlled worms do not utilize their full arsenals and that the player would wish that there were more weapons, more diverse graphics and sound, and more content. Matthew Pierce of PC Gamer UK commended Team17 for addressing the problems of single-player (i.e. the missions and AI) that the original Worms and Worms 2 had always been criticized for.

The Dreamcast version's reception was positive. Johnny Liu of Game Revolution praised the version for its "addictive" gameplay, its loads of personality, and not having to save money to buy multiple controllers for multiplayer, but criticized the version for the lack of Internet support, reduced customizations compared to the PC version, and the lack of a multiple-controller option. On the contrary, Ben Stahl of GameSpot praised the multiple controller ports as well as multiplayer for being fast-paced and turned into a "barrage of havoc", but criticized the single-player for the AI-controlled worms' nearly perfect accuracy and the length of time that it takes for such worms to complete their turns. He also pointed out that the worms' high-pitched voices are "only mildly cute" and can potentially be annoying, but praised the soundtracks for lending in realism to an otherwise unrealistic experience and the background music for helping players stay on task.

The Game Boy Color port received mixed reviews. Concluding that the port is an "abridged edition of the overall game", Craig Harris of IGN criticized the version's great lack of the PC version's features (e.g. weapons) and personality and pointed out its "quirky" graphics. The reviewer felt that the game's front end was "extremely thrown together". He concluded that it was still fun to play. Chris Hudak of The Electric Playground similarly criticized the lack of weapons and also criticized the lack of soundbites and complete lack of voices and what he perceived to be "microscopic" worms that are tough for the eye to see. He did, however, praise the terrain and physics engine for being well translated from the other versions of the game.

Michael Wolf reviewed the Nintendo 64 version of the game for Next Generation, rating it three stars out of five, and stated that "a good rental if you're planning a gaming party, but for day-to-day gaming, these annelids just don't cut it".

Awards

The editors of PC Gamer US nominated Armageddon for their 1999 "Best Turn-Based Strategy Game" award, which ultimately went to Sid Meier's Alpha Centauri. They wrote that Armageddon "put up one hell of a fight [for the award] and should not be overlooked by fans of the genre". It was also a runner-up for GameSpots annual "Best Strategy Game" award among console games, losing to Ogre Battle 64.

Legacy
Worms Armageddon has been placed on several lists of the greatest games of all time. Digital Spy ranked Worms Armageddon at No. 18 on their list of the top 20 Nintendo 64 games of all time. GamesRadar ranked the game at No. 13 on their list of the top 50 PlayStation I games of all time. They also ranked it at No. 68 on their list of the top 100 video games of all time. Slant Magazine ranked the game at No. 100 on their similar list. TechRadar listed the game as one of their favourite PC games of all time.

Team17 chose to base the source code of the 2016 game Worms W.M.D entirely on that of Worms Armageddon, because fans frequently told them upon questioning that Worms Armageddon was their favourite game in the series. Additionally, the 2009 game Worms 2: Armageddon was named in honor of Worms Armageddon despite not being a direct sequel.

In 2022, Worms Armageddon added to the premium collection of PlayStation Plus.

Notes

References

External links
 
Official game website
 Worms 2 at MobyGames
Worms Armageddon at MobyGames

1999 video games
Artillery video games
Cancelled classic Mac OS games
Dreamcast games
Game Boy Color games
Hasbro games
Infogrames games
MicroProse games
Nintendo 64 games
PlayStation (console) games
Strategy video games
Video games developed in the United Kingdom
Video games scored by Bjørn Lynne
Windows games
 03